The 2012–13 Chicago Bulls season was the 47th season of the franchise in the National Basketball Association (NBA). Derrick Rose missed the entire season while still recovering from a torn ACL in which he sustained during Game 1 of last year's playoffs. Despite his absence, the Bulls still managed a 45-37 record as the Number 5 seed in the East.  The only highlights of this season were the Bulls ending a 27-game winning streak of the defending champion Miami Heat and a 13-game winning streak of the New York Knicks in order to become the second team in league history to snap two winning streaks of 13 or more games. In the playoffs, after defeating the Brooklyn Nets in a tough seven-game first round series, the Bulls were eliminated in the next round by the Heat in five games. Miami would eventually win their second consecutive title after defeating the San Antonio Spurs in seven games.

Key dates
 June 28 – The 2012 NBA draft took place in Newark, New Jersey, at the Prudential Center.

Draft picks

Future draft picks

Credits

2013 first round draft pick from Charlotte

Charlotte's own 2013 1st round draft pick to Chicago (top-12 protected in the 2013 Draft, top-10 protected in 2014, top-8 protected in 2015 and unprotected in the 2016 Draft.) [Charlotte – Chicago, 2/18/2010].

Debits

No picks owed

Roster

Pre-season

|- style="background: #cfc;"
| 1
| October 9
| Memphis
| 
| Luol Deng (18)
| Nazr Mohammed (12)
| Kirk Hinrich (7)
| United Center21,003
| 1–0
|- style="background:#fcc;"
| 2
| October 12
| Cleveland
| 
| Kirk Hinrich (14)
| Nazr Mohammed (11)
| Kirk Hinrich (8)
| Assembly Hall8,678
| 1–1
|- style="background:#fcc;"
| 3
| October 13
| @ Minnesota
| 
| Kirk Hinrich (15)
| Joakim Noah (13)
| Jimmy Butler, Kirk Hinrich (3)
| Target Center12,251
| 1–2
|- style="background:#cfc;"
| 4
| October 16
| Milwaukee
| 
| Nate Robinson (24)
| Joakim Noah (12)
| Nate Robinson (13)
| United Center21,073
| 2–2
|- style="background:#cfc;"
| 5
| October 19
| Minnesota
| 
| Carlos Boozer (24)
| Joakim Noah (12)
| Kirk Hinrich (8)
| United Center21,418
| 3–2
|- style="background:#cfc;"
| 6
| October 23
| Oklahoma City
| 
| Carlos Boozer (24)
| Carlos Boozer (12)
| Carlos Boozer (5)
| United Center21,532
| 4–2
|- style="background:#cfc;"
| 7
| October 26
| Indiana
| 
| Nate Robinson (21)
| Taj Gibson (11)
| Nate Robinson (8)
| Edmund P. Joyce Center9,149
| 5–2

Standings

Game log

|- style="background:#cfc;"
| 1
| October 31
| Sacramento
| 
| Joakim Noah (23)
| Luol Deng (12)
| Kirk Hinrich (7)
| United Center21,313
| 1–0

|- style="background:#cfc;"
| 2
| November 2
| @ Cleveland
| 
| Boozer & Hamilton (19)
| Carlos Boozer (7)
| Nate Robinson (12)
| Quicken Loans Arena20,562
| 2–0
|- style="background:#fcc;"
| 3
| November 3
| New Orleans
| 
| Luol Deng (19)
| Joakim Noah (11)
| Deng & Hinrich (4)
| United Center21,758
| 2–1
|- style="background:#cfc;"
| 4
| November 6
| Orlando
| 
| Luol Deng (23)
| Joakim Noah (9)
| Nate Robinson (6)
| United Center21,216
| 3–1
|- style="background:#fcc;"
| 5
| November 8
| Oklahoma City
| 
| Luol Deng (27)
| Joakim Noah (13)
| Joakim Noah (6)
| United Center21,737
| 3–2
|- style="background:#cfc;"
| 6
| November 10
| Minnesota
| 
| Nate Robinson (18)
| Carlos Boozer (9)
| Boozer & Deng (4)
| United Center21,974
| 4–2
|- style="background:#fcc;"
| 7
| November 12
| Boston
| 
| Luol Deng (26)
| Deng & Noah (11)
| Nate Robinson (7)
| United Center21,712
| 4–3
|- style="background:#cfc;"
| 8
| November 14
| @ Phoenix
| 
| Carlos Boozer (28)
| Carlos Boozer (14)
| Kirk Hinrich (7)
| US Airways Center15,305
| 5–3
|- style="background:#fcc;"
| 9
| November 17
| @ L.A. Clippers
| 
| Carlos Boozer (22)
| Carlos Boozer (12)
| Kirk Hinrich (10)
| Staples Center19,060
| 5–4
|- style="background:#fcc;"
| 10
| November 18
| @ Portland
| 
| Nate Robinson (18)
| Joakim Noah (15)
| Joakim Noah (8)
| Rose Garden20,242
| 5–5
|- style="background:#fcc;"
| 11
| November 21
| @ Houston
| 
| Nate Robinson (21)
| Carlos Boozer (15)
| Kirk Hinrich (6)
| Toyota Center15,950
| 5–6
|- style="background:#cfc;"
| 12
| November 24
| @ Milwaukee
| 
| Boozer & Hamilton (22)
| Carlos Boozer (19)
| Joakim Noah (5)
| Bradley Center14,812
| 6–6
|- style="background:#fcc;"
| 13
| November 26
| Milwaukee
| 
| Richard Hamilton (30)
| Carlos Boozer (11)
| Kirk Hinrich (6)
| United Center21,485
| 6–7
|- style="background:#cfc;"
| 14
| November 28
| Dallas
| 
| Luol Deng (22)
| Joakim Noah (10)
| Nate Robinson (6)
| United Center21,575
| 7–7

|- style="background:#cfc;"
| 15
| December 1
| Philadelphia
| 
| Luol Deng (25)
| Joakim Noah (13)
| Deng & Noah (7)
| United Center21,607
| 8–7
|- style="background:#fcc;"
| 16
| December 4
| Indiana
| 
| Nate Robinson (19)
| Carlos Boozer (10)
| Kirk Hinrich (6)
| United Center21,152
| 8–8
|- style="background:#cfc;"
| 17
| December 5
| @ Cleveland
| 
| Marco Belinelli (23)
| Joakim Noah (15)
| Kirk Hinrich (8)
| Quicken Loans Arena17,893
| 9–8
|- style="background:#cfc;"
| 18
| December 7
| @ Detroit
| 
| Joakim Noah (30)
| Joakim Noah (23)
| Deng, Hinrich & Noah (6)
| The Palace of Auburn Hills17,142
| 10–8
|- style="background:#cfc;"
| 19
| December 8
| New York
| 
| Belinelli & Deng (22)
| Joakim Noah (11)
| Nate Robinson (8)
| United Center21,852
| 11–8
|- style="background:#fcc;"
| 20
| December 11
| L.A. Clippers
| 
| Carlos Boozer (24)
| Carlos Boozer (13)
| Joakim Noah (6)
| United Center21,571
| 11–9
|- style="background:#cfc;"
| 21
| December 12
| @ Philadelphia
| 
| Joakim Noah (21)
| Luol Deng (12)
| Joakim Noah (5)
| Wells Fargo Center15,738
| 12–9
|- style="background:#cfc;"
| 22
| December 15
| Brooklyn
| 
| Marco Belinelli (19)
| Joakim Noah (10)
| Noah & Robinson (5)
| United Center21,866
| 13–9
|- style="background:#fcc;"
| 23
| December 17
| @ Memphis
| 
| Carlos Boozer (16)
| Carlos Boozer (13)
| Kirk Hinrich (5)
| FedExForum17,305
| 13–10
|- style="background:#cfc;"
| 24
| December 18
| Boston
| 
| Boozer & Deng (21)
| Joakim Noah (13)
| Joakim Noah (10)
| United Center21,825
| 14–10
|- style="background:#cfc;"
| 25
| December 21
| @ New York
| 
| Luol Deng (29)
| Luol Deng (13)
| Kirk Hinrich (8)
| Madison Square Garden19,033
| 15–10
|- style="background:#fcc;"
| 26
| December 22
| @ Atlanta
| 
| Luol Deng (11)
| Joakim Noah (9)
| Nate Robinson (5)
| Philips Arena17,782
| 15–11
|- style="background:#fcc;"
| 27
| December 25
| Houston
| 
| Nate Robinson (27)
| Joakim Noah (9)
| Hinrich & Noah (4)
| United Center22,310
| 15–12
|-
| PPD
| December 26
| @ Indiana
| || || || || Bankers Life Fieldhouse||
|- style="background:#cfc;"
| 28
| December 29
| Washington
| 
| Marco Belinelli (17)
| Carlos Boozer (12)
| Kirk Hinrich (7)
| United Center22,447
| 16–12
|- style="background:#fcc;"
| 29
| December 31
| Charlotte
| 
| Luol Deng (20)
| Carlos Boozer (14)
| Nate Robinson (7)
| United Center21,986
| 16–13
|-

|- style="background:#cfc;"
| 30
| January 2
| @ Orlando
| 
| Carlos Boozer (31)
| Boozer & Gibson (11)
| Richard Hamilton (9)
| Amway Center18,846
| 17–13
|- style="background:#cfc;"
| 31
| January 4
| @ Miami
| 
| Carlos Boozer (27)
| Boozer & Noah (12)
| Kirk Hinrich (8)
| American Airlines Arena20,138
| 18–13
|- style="background:#cfc;"
| 32
| January 7
| Cleveland
| 
| Carlos Boozer (24)
| Boozer & Noah (11)
| Deng & Robinson (7)
| United Center21,355
| 19–13
|- style="background:#fcc;"
| 33
| January 9
| Milwaukee
| 
| Carlos Boozer (22)
| Joakim Noah (12)
| Nate Robinson (6)
| United Center21,570
| 19–14
|- style="background:#cfc;"
| 34
| January 11
| @ New York
| 
| Luol Deng (33)
| Joakim Noah (8)
| Kirk Hinrich (7)
| Madison Square Garden19,033
| 20–14
|- style="background:#fcc;"
| 35
| January 12
| Phoenix
| 
| Carlos Boozer (15)
| Joakim Noah (13)
| Nate Robinson (6)
| United Center21,874
| 20–15
|- style="background:#cfc;"
| 36
| January 14
| Atlanta
| 
| Carlos Boozer (20)
| Joakim Noah (16)
| Boozer, Hinrich,& Robinson (3)
| United Center21,430
| 21–15
|- style="background:#cfc;"
| 37
| January 16
| @ Toronto
| 
| Carlos Boozer (36)
| Joakim Noah (14)
| Luol Deng (7)
| Air Canada Centre18,674
| 22–15
|- style="background:#cfc;"
| 38
| January 18
| @ Boston
| 
| Richard Hamilton (20)
| Carlos Boozer (20)
| Kirk Hinrich (5)
| TD Garden18,624
| 23–15
|- style="background:#fcc;"
| 39
| January 19
| Memphis
| 
| Jimmy Butler (18)
| Carlos Boozer (14)
| Nate Robinson (5)
| United Center22,124
| 23–16
|- style="background:#cfc;"
| 40
| January 21
| L.A. Lakers
| 
| Kirk Hinrich (22)
| Joakim Noah (13)
| Kirk Hinrich (8)
| United Center22,550
| 24–16
|- style="background:#cfc;"
| 41
| January 23
| Detroit
| 
| Jimmy Butler (18)
| Joakim Noah (18)
| Nate Robinson (7)
| United Center21,567
| 25–16
|- style="background:#cfc;"
| 42
| January 25
| Golden State
| 
| Kirk Hinrich (25)
| Joakim Noah (16)
| Richard Hamilton (5)
| United Center21,756
| 26–16
|- style="background:#fcc;"
| 43
| January 26
| @ Washington
| 
| Nate Robinson (19)
| Joakim Noah (17)
| Joakim Noah (10)
| Verizon Center20,308
| 26–17
|- style="background:#cfc;"
| 44
| January 28
| Charlotte
| 
| Jimmy Butler (19)
| Joakim Noah (18)
| Joakim Noah (7)
| United Center21,308
| 27–17
|- style="background:#cfc;"
| 45
| January 30
| @ Milwaukee
| 
| Nate Robinson (24)
| Luol Deng (13)
| Kirk Hinrich (8)
| Bradley Center17,640
| 28–17
|-

|- style="background:#fcc;"
| 46
| February 1
| @ Brooklyn
| 
| Belinelli & Deng (18)
| Taj Gibson (9)
| Nate Robinson (11)
| Barclays Center17,732
| 28–18
|- style="background:#cfc;"
| 47
| February 2
| @ Atlanta
| 
| Luol Deng (25)
| Taj Gibson (19)
| Nate Robinson (8)
| Philips Arena17,898
| 29–18
|- style="background:#fcc;"
| 48
| February 4
| @ Indiana
| 
| Marco Belinelli (24)
| Taj Gibson (11)
| Nate Robinson (9)
| Bankers Life Fieldhouse18,165
| 29–19
|- style="background:#fcc;"
| 49
| February 7
| @ Denver
| 
| Daequan Cook (19)
| Luol Deng (8)
| Nate Robinson (6)
| Pepsi Center19,325
| 29–20
|- style="background:#cfc;"
| 50
| February 8
| @ Utah
| 
| Carlos Boozer (19)
| Joakim Noah (11)
| Nate Robinson (9)
| EnergySolutions Arena19,911
| 30–20
|- style="background:#fcc;"
| 51
| February 11
| San Antonio
| 
| Nate Robinson (20)
| Joakim Noah (15)
| Nate Robinson (7)
| United Center21,955
| 30–21
|- style="background:#fcc;"
| 52
| February 13
| @ Boston
| 
| Marco Belinelli (12)
| Joakim Noah (16)
| Nate Robinson (6)
| TD Garden18,624
| 30–22
|- align="center"
|colspan="9" bgcolor="#bbcaff"|All-Star Break
|- style="background:#cfc;"
| 53
| February 19
| @ New Orleans
| 
| Luol Deng (20)
| Joakim Noah (17)
| Kirk Hinrich (10)
| New Orleans Arena13,612
| 31–22
|- style="background:#fcc;"
| 54
| February 21
| Miami
| 
| Nate Robinson (14)
| Carlos Boozer (11)
| Joakim Noah (8)
| United Center22,640
| 31–23
|- style="background:#cfc;"
| 55
| February 22
| @ Charlotte
| 
| Taj Gibson (17)
| Carlos Boozer (10)
| Joakim Noah (8)
| Time Warner Cable Arena17,870
| 32–23
|- style="background:#fcc;"
| 56
| February 24
| @ Oklahoma City
| 
| Luol Deng (13)
| Joakim Noah (9)
| Nate Robinson (5)
| Chesapeake Energy Arena18,203
| 32–24
|- style="background:#fcc;"
| 57
| February 26
| Cleveland
| 
| Carlos Boozer (27)
| Joakim Noah (9)
| Kirk Hinrich (11)
| United Center21,501
| 32–25
|- style="background:#cfc;"
| 58
| February 28
| Philadelphia
| 
| Joakim Noah (23)
| Joakim Noah (21)
| Kirk Hinrich (6)
| United Center21,576
| 33–25
|-

|- style="background:#cfc;"
| 59
| March 2
| Brooklyn
| 
| Joakim Noah (21)
| Joakim Noah (10)
| Joakim Noah (5)
| United Center22,414
| 34–25
|- style="background:#fcc;"
| 60
| March 3
| @ Indiana
| 
| Belinelli & Butler (20)
| Joakim Noah (10)
| Nate Robinson (6)
| Bankers Life Fieldhouse17,533
| 34–26
|- style="background:#fcc;"
| 61
| March 6
| @ San Antonio
| 
| Marco Belinelli (21)
| Joakim Noah (13)
| Marco Belinelli (7)
| AT&T Center18,581
| 34–27
|- style="background:#cfc;"
| 62
| March 8
| Utah
| 
| Belinelli & Boozer (22)
| Joakim Noah (13)
| Nate Robinson (7)
| United Center 21,842
| 35–27
|- style="background:#fcc;"
| 63
| March 10
| @ L.A. Lakers
| 
| Nate Robinson (19)
| Joakim Noah (17)
| Nate Robinson (8)
| Staples Center18,997
| 35–28
|- style="background:#fcc;"
| 64
| March 13
| @ Sacramento
| 
| Carlos Boozer (21)
| Joakim Noah (9)
| Carlos Boozer (4)
| Power Balance Pavilion14,426
| 35–29
|- style="background:#cfc;"
| 65
| March 15
| @ Golden State
| 
| Luol Deng (23)
| Joakim Noah (13)
| Nate Robinson (7)
| Oracle Arena19,596
| 36–29
|- style="background:#fcc;"
| 66
| March 18
| Denver
| 
| Nate Robinson (34)
| Joakim Noah (12)
| Joakim Noah (6)
| United Center 22,138
| 36–30
|- style="background:#fcc;"
| 67
| March 21
| Portland
| 
| Joakim Noah (18)
| Carlos Boozer (11)
| Nate Robinson (9)
| United Center21,946
| 36–31
|- style="background:#cfc;"
| 68
| March 23
| Indiana
| 
| Luol Deng (20)
| Carlos Boozer (10)
| Kirk Hinrich (5)
| United Center22,494
| 37–31
|- style="background:#cfc;"
| 69
| March 24
| @ Minnesota
| 
| Nate Robinson (22)
| Carlos Boozer (12)
| Nate Robinson (10)
| Target Center17,330
| 38–31
|- style="background:#cfc;"
| 70
| March 27
| Miami
| 
| Luol Deng (28)
| Carlos Boozer (17)
| Kirk Hinrich (6)
| United Center23,014
| 39–31
|- style="background:#fcc;"
| 71
| March 30
| @ Dallas
| 
| Luol Deng (25)
| Carlos Boozer (11)
| Kirk Hinrich (6)
| American Airlines Center20,502
| 39–32
|- style="background:#cfc;"
| 72
| March 31
| Detroit
| 
| Luol Deng (28)
| Luol Deng (9)
| Kirk Hinrich (6)
| United Center21,864
| 40–32
|-

|- style="background:#fcc;"
| 73
| April 2
| @ Washington
| 
| Carlos Boozer (19)
| Boozer & Mohammed (12)
| Carlos Boozer (5)
| Verizon Center17,319
| 40–33
|- style="background:#cfc;"
| 74
| April 4
| @ Brooklyn
| 
| Carlos Boozer (29)
| Carlos Boozer (18)
| Kirk Hinrich (6)
| Barclays Center 17,732
| 41–33
|- style="background:#cfc;"
| 75
| April 5
| Orlando
| 
| Deng & Robinson (19)
| Nazr Mohammed (11)
| Nate Robinson (5)
| United Center22,268
| 42–33
|- style="background:#fcc;"
| 76
| April 7
| @ Detroit
| 
| Carlos Boozer (21)
| Carlos Boozer (10)
| Kirk Hinrich (8)
| The Palace of Auburn Hills19,577
| 42–34
|- style="background:#fcc;"
| 77
| April 9
| Toronto
| 
| Jimmy Butler (28)
| Carlos Boozer (11)
| Carlos Boozer (8)
| United Center21,487
| 42–35
|- style="background:#cfc;"
| 78
| April 11
| New York
| 
| Nate Robinson (35)
| Carlos Boozer (15)
| Richard Hamilton (8)
| United Center22,464
| 43–35
|- style="background:#fcc;"
| 79
| April 12
| @ Toronto
| 
| Carlos Boozer (19)
| Nazr Mohammed (13)
| Luol Deng (8)
| Air Canada Centre19,800
| 43–36
|- style="background:#fcc;"
| 80
| April 14
| @ Miami
| 
| Luol Deng (19)
| Carlos Boozer (20)
| Hinrich, Boozer, Belinelli & Deng (3)
| American Airlines Arena19,810
| 43–37
|- style="background:#cfc;"
| 81
| April 15
| @ Orlando
| 
| Carlos Boozer (22)
| Jimmy Butler (10)
| Luol Deng (8)
| Amway Center17,297
| 44–37
|- style="background:#cfc;"
| 82
| April 17
| Washington
| 
| Carlos Boozer (19)
| Carlos Boozer (15)
| Hinrich & Deng (5)
| United Center22,421
| 45–37
|-

Playoffs

Game log

|- style="background:#fcc;"
| 1
| April 20
| @ Brooklyn
| 
| Carlos Boozer (25)
| Carlos Boozer (8)
| Carlos Boozer (4)
| Barclays Center17,732
| 0–1
|- style="background:#cfc;"
| 2
| April 22
| @ Brooklyn
| 
| Luol Deng (15)
| Carlos Boozer (12)
| Kirk Hinrich (5)
| Barclays Center17,732
| 1–1
|- style="background:#cfc;"
| 3
| April 25
| Brooklyn
| 
| Carlos Boozer (22)
| Carlos Boozer (16)
| Boozer & Deng (3)
| United Center21,672
| 2–1
|- style="background:#cfc;"
| 4
| April 27
| Brooklyn
| 
| Nate Robinson (34)
| Joakim Noah (13)
| Kirk Hinrich (14)
| United Center21,758
| 3–1
|- style="background:#fcc;"
| 5
| April 29
| @ Brooklyn
| 
| Nate Robinson (20)
| Carlos Boozer (10)
| Nate Robinson (8)
| Barclays Center17,732
| 3–2
|- style="background:#fcc;"
| 6
| May 2
| Brooklyn
| 
| Marco Belinelli (22)
| Joakim Noah (15)
| Marco Belinelli (7)
| United Center21,810
| 3–3
|- style="background:#cfc;"
| 7
| May 4
| @ Brooklyn
| 
| Noah & Belinelli (24)
| Joakim Noah (14)
| Robinson & Butler (4)
| Barclays Center17,732
| 4–3

|-style="background:#cfc;"
| 1
| May 6
| @ Miami
| 
| Nate Robinson (27)
| Jimmy Butler (14)
| Nate Robinson (9)
| American Airlines Arena19,685
| 1–0
|- style="background:#fcc;"
| 2
| May 8
| @ Miami
| 
| Marco Belinelli (13)
| Joakim Noah (6)
| Marco Belinelli (6)
| American Airlines Arena19,817
| 1-1
|- style="background:#fcc;"
| 3
| May 10
| Miami
| 
| Carlos Boozer (21)
| Joakim Noah (11)
| Nate Robinson (7)
| United Center22,675
| 1-2
|- style="background:#fcc;"
| 4
| May 13
| Miami
| 
| Carlos Boozer (14)
| Carlos Boozer (11)
| Nate Robinson (7)
| United Center21,990
| 1-3
|- style="background:#fcc;"
| 5
| May 15
| @ Miami
| 
| Carlos Boozer (26)
| Carlos Boozer (14)
| Nate Robinson (6)
| American Airlines Arena20,250
| 1-4

Player statistics

Season

|- align="center" bgcolor="#f0f0f0"
|  || 1 || 0 || 2.0 || .000 || .000 || .000 || 1.0 || 0.0 || 0.0 || 0.0 || 0.0
|- align="center" bgcolor=""
|  || 73 || 27 || 25.8 || .395 || .357 || .839 || 1.9 || 2.0 || 0.60 || 0.08 || 9.6
|- align="center" bgcolor="#f0f0f0"
|  || 79 || style="background:black;color:white;" | 79 || 32.2 || .477 || .000 || .731 || 9.8 || 2.3 || 0.84 || 0.35 || 16.2
|- align="center" bgcolor=""
|  || style="background:black;color:white;" | 82 || 20 || 26.0 || .467 || .381 || .803 || 4.0 || 1.4 || 0.95 || 0.38 || 8.5
|- align="center" bgcolor="#f0f0f0"
|  || 33 || 0 || 8.4 || .278 || .246 || .778 || 1.3 || 0.3 || 0.06 || 0.15 || 2.5
|- align="center" bgcolor=""
|  || 75 || 75 || style="background:black;color:white;" | 38.7 || .426 || .322 || .816 || 6.3 || 3.0 || 1.08 || 0.43 || style="background:black;color:white;" | 16.5
|- align="center" bgcolor="#f0f0f0"
|  || 65 || 5 || 22.4 || style="background:black;color:white;" | .485 || .000 || .679 || 5.3 || 0.9 || 0.42 || 1.38 || 8.0
|- align="center" bgcolor=""
|  || 50 || 45 || 21.8 || .429 || .308 || style="background:black;color:white;" | .857 || 1.7 || 2.4 || 0.48 || 0.10 || 9.8
|- align="center" bgcolor="#f0f0f0"
|  || 60 || 60 || 29.4 || .377 || .390 || .714 || 2.6 || style="background:black;color:white;" | 5.2 || 1.05 || 0.42 || 7.7
|- align="center" bgcolor=""
|  || 63 || 12 || 11.0 || .367 || .000 || .723 || 3.1 || 0.4 || 0.33 || 0.51 || 2.6
|- align="center" bgcolor="#f0f0f0"
|  || 66 || 64 || 36.8 || .481 || .000 || .751 || style="background:black;color:white;" | 11.1 || 4.0 || style="background:black;color:white;" | 1.18 || style="background:black;color:white;" | 2.14 || 11.9
|- align="center" bgcolor=""
|  || 25 || 0 || 5.8 || .302 || .185 || .667 || 1.1 || 0.3 || 0.32 || 0.16 || 1.3
|- align="center" bgcolor="#f0f0f0"
|  || style="background:black;color:white;" | 82 || 23 || 25.4 || .433 || style="background:black;color:white;" | .405 || .799 || 2.2 || 4.4 || 1.04 || 0.12 || 13.1
|- align="center" bgcolor=""
|  || 0 || 0 || 00.0 || .000 || .000 || .000 || 0.0 || 0.0 || 0.0 || 0.0 || 0.0
|- align="center" bgcolor="#f0f0f0"
|  || 48 || 0 || 8.2 || .381 || .174 || .563 || 0.9 || 1.3 || 0.19 || 0.15 || 2.1
|- align="center" bgcolor=""
|  || 7 || 0 || 5.1 || .556 || .000 || .500 || 1.6 || 0.3 || 0.29 || 0.14 || 1.7
|}

Awards, records and milestones

Awards

Week/Month

All-Star
 Luol Deng was named an All-Star reserve by coaches for the second straight year.
 Joakim Noah made his first All-Star appearance at the 2013 NBA All-Star Game held in Houston.

Records

Milestones

Transactions

Trades

Free agents

References

Chicago Bulls seasons
Chicago Bulls
Chicago
Chicago